Isabella Marianne Peggy Wranå (born 22 June 1997) is a Swedish curler. She is a former skip of the Swedish junior women's team, with whom she won a World Junior championship in 2017. In 2018, she was inducted into the Swedish Curling Hall of Fame.

Career

Juniors
Wranå has skipped the Swedish team in four World Junior Curling Championships, in 2014, 2015, 2017 and 2018. In 2014, she led her team of Jennie Wåhlin, Elin Lövstrand, Fanny Sjöberg and Almida de Val to a fourth-place finish, after they lost in the bronze medal game to Russia. In 2015, she and teammates Wåhlin, Johanna Heldin, Sjöberg and Johanna Höglund again finished fourth after this time losing to Switzerland in the bronze medal game. She was back at it in 2017 when her and teammates Wåhlin, de Val and Sjöberg won the gold medal, defeating Scotland's Sophie Jackson in the final, and lost just two round robin games in the process. The next year the same team went undefeated in the round robin, but ended up losing to Canada's Kaitlyn Jones in the final. This team also represented Sweden at the 2017 Winter Universiade, where they took home the bronze medal.

Women's
As World Junior champions, Wranå qualified for the 2017 Humpty's Champions Cup, her first Grand Slam event. The team did not qualify for the playoffs but did win one game. The team won their first World Curling Tour event at the 2018 AMJ Campbell Shorty Jenkins Classic. A month later, they won the Paf Masters Tour. Over the course of the 2018–19 season, Wranå's team played in four slams, failing to qualify in any of the four. They won one game at the 2018 Tour Challenge, one game at the 2018 National, no games at the 2019 Canadian Open and one game at the 2019 Champions Cup. Also during this season, Wranå skipped her team to a gold medal at the 2019 Winter Universiade.

Team Wranå had a successful 2019–20 season, winning two tour events (the Royal LePage Women's Fall Classic and the Paf Masters Tour once again) and finishing second at the Women's Masters Basel and the Glynhill Ladies International. They played in two slam events, winning one game at both the 2019 Tour Challenge and the 2019 National.

Due to the COVID-19 pandemic, Team Wranå only played in one tour event during the abbreviated 2020–21 season. The team competed at the 2020 Women's Masters Basel, where they missed the playoffs with a 1–2 record. In December, they played Team Hasselborg in the Sweden National Challenge, where they won by a score of 17–12. The Swedish Women's Curling Championship was cancelled due to the pandemic, so Team Hasselborg was named as the Swedish Team for the 2021 World Women's Curling Championship. After the season, longtime lead Fanny Sjöberg stepped back from competitive curling and Maria Larsson joined the team as their new lead.

In their first event of the 2021–22 season, Team Wranå reached the final of the 2021 Euro Super Series where they lost to Rebecca Morrison. They also reached the semifinals of the 2021 Women's Masters Basel before being eliminated by Denmark's Madeleine Dupont. After missing the playoffs at the 2021 Masters, Team Wranå made the playoffs at a Grand Slam event for the first time at the 2021 National before being eliminated in the quarterfinals by Kelsey Rocque. Elsewhere on tour, the team reached the semifinals of both the Red Deer Curling Classic and the International Bernese Ladies Cup. At the Swedish Eliteserien in February, the team defeated Tova Sundberg to claim the event title. They also beat Sundberg in the final of the 2022 Swedish Women's Curling Championship in March. Team Wranå wrapped up their season at the 2022 Players' Championship Grand Slam where they once again qualified for the playoffs. They then lost to Tracy Fleury in the quarterfinal round. A highlight of the Players' Championship came when Wranå lost her broom during one of her shots in the game against Krista McCarville, however, she was still able to deliver the stone.

Mixed
Wranå also represented Sweden at the 2014 European Mixed Curling Championship, throwing third rocks for the team, which was skipped by Patric Mabergs. The team would go on to win the gold medal. Wranå skipped the Swedish mixed team and threw third rocks at the 2017 World Mixed Curling Championship. The team, which included Patric Mabergs, Johannes Patz and Sofia Mabergs  went undefeated in group play, but lost to Scotland in the quarterfinals.

Wranå participates in mixed doubles curling with her brother Rasmus. The two won their first mixed doubles tour event at the 2020 Mixed Doubles Bern event. In 2022, the pair represented Sweden at the 2022 World Mixed Doubles Curling Championship in Geneva, Switzerland. After a 7–2 round robin record, they lost to Germany's Pia-Lisa Schöll and Klaudius Harsch in a qualification game, eliminating them in fifth place.

Personal life
Wranå attended high school at Härnösands gymnasium. She lives in Stockholm.

Grand Slam record

References

External links

Isabella Wranaa - Athlete information | 2017 Winter Universiade | FISU

Swedish female curlers
Living people
1997 births
Sportspeople from Stockholm
Universiade medalists in curling
Universiade gold medalists for Sweden
Universiade bronze medalists for Sweden
Competitors at the 2019 Winter Universiade
Competitors at the 2017 Winter Universiade